The following outline is provided as an overview of and topical guide to the U.S. state of Hawaii:

Hawaii is the newest state among the 50 states of the United States of America. It is also the southernmost state, the only tropical state, and the only state that was previously an independent monarchy.  The state comprises the Hawaiian Islands (with the exception of Midway) in the North Pacific Ocean and is the only U.S. state that is not primarily located on the continent of North America.

General reference

 Names
 Common name: Hawaii
 Pronunciation: 
 Official name: State of Hawaii (use of ʻokina preferred, but not required), Hawaiian: Mokuāina o Hawaii
 Abbreviations and name codes
 Postal symbol:  HI
 ISO 3166-2 code:  US-HI
 Internet second-level domain:  .hi.us
 Nicknames
 Aloha State (currently used on license plates)
 Paradise of the Pacific
 Pineapple State
 Rainbow State
 Youngest State
 Adjectivals
 Hawaii
 Hawaiian
 Demonyms
 Hawaii Resident
 Hawaiian
  Transitive verb 
 Hawaiianize

Geography of Hawaii

Geography of Hawaii – Unlike the other states of the Union, Hawaii is a group of islands, located in the Pacific Ocean.
 Hawaii is: a U.S. state, a federal state of the United States of America
 Location
 Northern hemisphere
 Pacific Ocean
  North Pacific Ocean
Hawaiian Islands
 United States
Western United States
 Western hemisphere
 Population of Hawaii: 1,455,271 (2020 U.S. Census)
 Area of Hawaii
 Atlas of Hawaii
 Places in Hawaii
 Historic places
 Archaeological sites in Hawaii
 Ghost towns in Hawaii
 National Historic Landmarks in Hawaii
 National Register of Historic Places listings
 Bridges on the National Register of Historic Places
 National Natural Landmarks in Hawaii
 :Category:National Park Service areas in Hawaii
 State parks in Hawaii

Environment of Hawaii

Environment of Hawaii 
 Endemism in the Hawaiian Islands
 Environmental issues in Hawaii
 Climate of Hawaii
Global warming in Hawaii
 Geology 
 Hawaii hotspot
 Superfund sites in Hawaii
 Wildlife of Hawaii
 Fauna of Hawaii
 Birds of Hawaii
 Endemic birds of Hawaii
 Non-marine molluscs of Hawaii
 Insects of Hawaii
 Lepidoptera (butterflies and moths) of Hawaii
 Invasive species in Hawaii

Geographic features of Hawaii
 Beaches of Hawaii
 Channels of the Hawaiian Islands
 Dams and reservoirs in Hawaii
 Leeward desert
 Manmade peninsula
 Mountain passes in Hawaii
 National Natural Landmarks in Hawaii
 Rivers of Hawaii
 Volcanoes of Hawaii
 Evolution of Hawaiian volcanoes
 Wilderness area

Natural Area Reserves of Hawaii
 Ahihi-Kinau

Administrative divisions of Hawaii

 The five counties of the state of Hawaii
 Communities in Hawaii
State capital of Hawaii:  Honolulu (the 55th largest city in the United States)
 City nicknames in Hawaii
 Sister cities in Hawaii
 Census-designated places in Hawaii

Demography of Hawaii

Demographics of Hawaii – Hawaii has a de facto population of over 1.4 million, due to large military and tourist populations.
 Ancient Hawaiian population
 Hawaii locations by per capita income

Government and politics of Hawaii

Government and politics of Hawaii
 Form of government: U.S. state government
 United States congressional delegations from Hawaii
 Hawaii State Capitol
 Elections in Hawaii
 Electoral reform in Hawaii
 Political party strength in Hawaii

Branches of the government of Hawaii

Government of Hawaii

Executive branch of the government of Hawaii
 Governor of Hawaii
 Lieutenant Governor of Hawaii
 Secretary of State of Hawaii
 State departments
 Hawai'i Department of Education
 Hawaii Department of Health
 Hawaii Department of Human Services
 Hawai'i Department of Land and Natural Resources
 Hawaii Department of Public Safety
 Hawaii Department of Transportation

Legislative branch of the government of Hawaii

 Hawaii State Legislature (bicameral)
 Upper house: Hawaii State Senate
 Lower house: Hawaii House of Representatives

Judicial branch of the government of Hawaii

 Courts of Hawaii
 Supreme Court of Hawaii

Law and order in Hawaii

 Cannabis in Hawaii
 Capital punishment in Hawaii: none. Hawaii abolished the death penalty prior to statehood. See also Capital punishment in the United States.
 Constitution of Hawaii
 Crime in Hawaii  
 Gun laws in Hawaii
 Law enforcement in Hawaii
 Law enforcement agencies in Hawaii
 State prisons of Hawaii
 Legal status of Hawaii
 LGBT rights in Hawaii
 Same-sex marriage in Hawaii

Military in Hawaii

 National Guard of Hawaii
 Hawaii Air National Guard
 Hawaii Army National Guard

History of Hawaii

History of Hawaii
 Discovery and settlement of Hawaii

History of Hawaii, by period 

Ancient Hawaii (before 1810)
Kingdom of Hawaii, 1810–1893
Kamehameha I, 1795–1819
Kamehameha II, 1819–1824
Kamehameha III, 1825–1854
Kamehameha IV, 1855–1863
Kamehameha V, 1863–1872
Lunalilo, 1873–1874
Kalākaua, 1874–1891
Liliʻuokalani, 1891–1893
 Overthrow of the Kingdom of Hawaii
Provisional Government of Hawaii, 1893–1894
Citizen's Committee of Public Safety, 1893–1894
Republic of Hawaii, 1894–1898
Sanford Ballard Dole, 1894–1898
Territory of Hawaii, 1898–1959
United States annexation, July 4, 1898
Hawaiian Organic Act of 1900
Hawaii National Park established on August 1, 1916
World War II, September 1, 1939 – September 2, 1945
Attack on Pearl Harbor, December 7, 1941
United States enters Second World War on December 8, 1941
State of Hawaii becomes 50th State admitted to the United States of America on August 21, 1959
Haleakala National Park designated on September 13, 1960
Hawaii National Park renamed Hawaii Volcanoes National Park on September 22, 1961
Hurricane Iniki, 1992

History of Hawaii, by region 
 History of Hawaii Island
  History of Maui
 History of Kahoolawe
 History of Lanai
 History of Molokai
 History of Oahu
 History of Kauai
 History of Niihau
 History of Honolulu

History of Hawaii, by subject 
 Constitution

Culture of Hawaii

Culture of Hawaii – the aboriginal culture of Hawaii is Polynesian. Hawaii represents the northernmost extension of the vast Polynesian triangle of the south and central Pacific Ocean. While traditional Hawaiian culture remains only as vestiges in modern Hawaiian society, there are reenactments of the ceremonies and traditions throughout the islands.
 Hawaiian architecture
Tallest buildings in Honolulu
 Cuisine of Hawaii
 Hawaiian dishes
 Breweries in Hawaii
 Restaurants in Hawaii
 Wine in Hawaii
 Culture of the Native Hawaiians
 Customs and etiquette in Hawaii
 Aloha greeting
 Aloha shirt
 Lei (garland)
 Shaka sign
 Folklore in Hawaii
 Holidays in Hawaii
 Christmas in Hawaii
 Museums in Hawaii
 Orders, decorations, and medals of Hawaii
 People of Hawaii
 Native Hawaiians
 Hawaiian home land
 Africans in Hawaii
 Asian immigration to Hawaii
 Chinese in Hawaii
 Filipinos in Hawaii
 Japanese in Hawaii
 Greeks in Hawaii
 Scouting in Hawaii
 State symbols of Hawaii
 Flag of the State of Hawai'i 
 Official state flower
 State Great Seal of the State of Hawai'i

The Arts in Hawaii

 Art of Hawaii
 Dance
 Music of Hawaii
 Hawaii Opera Theatre

Religion in Hawaii 

Religion in Hawaii
 Hawaiian Religion
 Islam in Hawaii
 Christianity in Hawaii
 The Church of Jesus Christ of Latter-day Saints in Hawaii
 Christmas in Hawaii
 Eastern Catholic Community in Hawaii
 Episcopal Diocese of Hawaii
 Orthodox Church in Hawaii
 Orthodox parishes in Hawaii

Economy and infrastructure of Hawaii

Economy of Hawaii 
 Agriculture in Hawaii
 Breweries in Hawaii
 Coffee production in Hawaii
 Kona coffee
 Hawaii wine
 Genetic engineering in Hawaii
 Macadamia nut
 Sugar plantations in Hawaii
 Banking
 Bank of Hawaii
 Hawaii National Bank
 Communications in Hawaii
 Telephone Area Code: 808
 Currency of Hawaii: Hawaiian dollar
 Coins of the Hawaiian dollar
 Energy in Hawaii
 Power stations in Hawaii
 Solar power in Hawaii
 Wind power in Hawaii
 Health care in Hawaii
 Hospitals in Hawaii
 Media in Hawaii
 Film and television in Hawaii
 Television stations in Hawaii
 Newspapers in Hawaii
 Radio stations in Hawaii
 Media in Honolulu
 Tourism in Hawaii
 Visa policy of the United States
 Transportation in Hawaii
 Aviation in Hawaii
 Airports in Hawaii
 Railroads in Hawaii
 State highways in Hawaii

Education in Hawaii

Education in Hawaii  
 Libraries in Hawaii
 Carnegie libraries in Hawaii
 Schools in Hawaii
 School districts in Hawaii
 High schools in Hawaii
 Colleges and universities in Hawaii
 University of Hawaii

See also

Topic overview:
Hawaii

Index of Hawaii-related articles

References

External links

Hawaii
Hawaii